Havixbeck (Westphalian: Havkesbierk or Havkesbieck) is a municipality situated on the north-east edge of the Baumberge in the district of Coesfeld, in northern North Rhine-Westphalia, Germany. It is located approximately 15 km west of Münster.

Geography

Geographical Location 
Havixbeck is located on the fringes of the Baumberge, with 187 m the highest elevations of the Münsterland. West of the town emanates the spring of Münstersche Aa which, after passing Münster, converges in the Ems River near Greven.

Adjacent municipalities 
Havixbeck borders (clockwise, starting north) on Altenberge (District of Steinfurt), the city of Münster, as well as Senden, Nottuln and Billerbeck (District of Coesfeld).

Division of the town 
The district of Hohenholte has a population of about 1,000 residents. In the parish church of St. George, a former monastery church, there is a crucifixion relief from the period around 1530/40 as well as the epitaph of the prioress Richmond Warendorp († 1503), both created by the sculptor Johann Brabender from Münster.

Politics

Local council 

Elections in 2014:	
CDU: 41,8%	
SPD: 26,3%	
Greens: 23,3%	
FDP: 8,6%

Results of local elections since 1975 
In the list, only political parties that received at least 2.95% of the votes in the election are listed:

Twin cities 
Havixbeck is twinned with the following places:
  Bellegarde (Loiret), France
  Bestensee near Berlin, Brandenburg

Economics and infrastructure 
The economy in Havixbeck consists mainly of small and medium-sized enterprises, mainly located in two major industrial areas.

Transportation 
The road network is excellent, there are good connections to Münster, as well as to the two nearby highways A1 and A43. Havixbeck is located at the railroadtrack between Münster and Coesfeld operating hourly. The travel times is approx. 17 minutes to Münster and 22 to Coesfeld.

Public Facilities 
With a little distance outside Havixbeck there is the Stift Tilbeck which offers housing and employment for people with disabilities.

Education 
Baumberge-Schule (Catholic elementary school)
Anne-Frank comprehensive school
Music school (in sponsorship of Jugendorchester Havixbeck e.V.)
Adult education centre (in cooperation with Dülmen and Haltern)

History

The German poet Annette von Droste-Hülshoff was born in the Havixbeck castlet Burg Hülshoff in 1797, where a museum with a retrospective of her work is open to the public.

References 

Coesfeld (district)